Çakmaklar is a village in the Adıyaman District, Adıyaman Province, Turkey. The village had a population of 259 in 2021.

References 

Villages in Adıyaman District
Kurdish settlements in Adıyaman Province